Cha Kwang-Su (born February 25, 1979) is an amateur North Korean Greco-Roman wrestler, who competed in the men's featherweight category. He won a bronze medal for his division at the 2006 Asian Games in Doha, Qatar. Cha also added three more medals (one gold and two silver) to his collection from the Asian Wrestling Championships.

Cha represented North Korea at the 2008 Summer Olympics in Beijing, where he competed for the men's 55 kg class. He received a bye for the preliminary round of sixteen match, before losing out to Cuba's Yagnier Hernández, who was able to score nine points in two straight periods, leaving Cha with a single point.

References

External links
Profile – International Wrestling Database
NBC Olympics Profile

1979 births
Living people
Olympic wrestlers of North Korea
Wrestlers at the 2008 Summer Olympics
Asian Games medalists in wrestling
Wrestlers at the 2002 Asian Games
Wrestlers at the 2006 Asian Games
North Korean male sport wrestlers
Asian Games bronze medalists for North Korea
Medalists at the 2006 Asian Games
Asian Wrestling Championships medalists
21st-century North Korean people